Agonidium alacre is a species of ground beetle in the subfamily Platyninae. It was described by Boheman in 1848.

References

alacre
Beetles described in 1848